Poutini Peak is a mountain in the Royal Society Range, Victoria Land, Antarctica. It was named by the New Zealand Geographic Board (NZGB) in 1994. In Māori mythology, Poutini is the guardian taniwha (or spirit) of the essence of New Zealand pounamu (greenstone).

Mountains of Victoria Land
Scott Coast